Harriet Burbank Rogers (April 12, 1834 – December 12, 1919) was an American educator, a pioneer in the oral method of instruction of the deaf. She was the first director of Clarke School for the Deaf, the first U.S. institution to teach the deaf by articulation and lip reading rather than by signing. Her success in teaching deaf children to speak helped change American public opinion, which was traditionally inclined toward sign language, opening the door for the auditory/oral method to be used in many American schools.

The controversy over which form of communication is preferable has continued since there are advantages and disadvantages to both methods. Rogers, having tried to use both methods, realized that it was confusing to deaf children to be taught both methods simultaneously. Subsequently, she advocated for the use of the auditory/oral method, with significant success. While sign language has advantages, and a deaf culture has emerged based on the use of this fully functioning language, For many, the ability to speak and lipread, and thus communicate with the hearing world, is an essential aspect of the education of the deaf. Rogers can therefore be recognized for her significant contribution.

Biography

Early years
Harriet Burbank Rogers was born on April 12, 1834, in North Billerica, Massachusetts, one of five daughters of Calvin Rogers. She graduated from Massachusetts State Normal School (now Framingham State College) in 1851, after which she taught at several schools in Massachusetts. She became interested in teaching children with special needs, probably through the experience of her sister, who worked as a teacher of deaf-blind children.

Teaching the deaf
Rogers became interested in the European method of teaching the deaf, which emphasized teaching of articulation through imitation of breathing patterns and larynx vibrations, rather than sign language. This method was considered far better in restoring the deaf to society and giving them a fuller knowledge of language, but was mostly rejected in the United States in favor of sign language. Rogers read German authors and received most of her knowledge through books.

Although she had no formal education to teach deaf children, in 1863, she was hired as a private tutor by the Cushing family to train their deaf daughter, Fanny. Rogers initially used both oral and sign methods, instructing Fanny to speak and to use her fingers to spell words. However, Rogers soon became aware that it was unwise to use both methods, so she turned completely toward the oral method. As Fanny gradually learned to speak, Rogers and her method became famous throughout the state.

Her success in teaching Fanny attracted the attention of Gardiner Hubbard, the Massachusetts businessman whose daughter Mabel was also deaf (she would later marry Alexander Graham Bell). Hubbard substantially supported Rogers, helping her to set up a school for the deaf in 1866, in Chelmsford, Massachusetts. The school initially had five students.

Auditory/oral vs. sign language
Rogers initially met strong resistance in using her oral method of education, as the educators of the deaf in the United States were traditionally inclined toward sign language. The controversy between auditory/oral and sign language educational method is an old controversy in deaf education. In the United States, ever since Thomas Hopkins Gallaudet founded the American School for the Deaf in Hartford, Connecticut, in 1817, the sign language method dominated deaf education. On the other hand, in Europe the auditory/oral method was the preferred method of education of the deaf.

Both approaches have certain pros and cons. The oral method stresses the importance of speech and oral language development. It emphasizes lips- and contextual-visual-clues-reading from the face and body. It also teaches to speak rather than to sign. The benefit of this method is that it provides the deaf individual with necessary spoken language skills to function independently in society. Individuals who rely on sign language always feel segregated among people that do not understand sign language. The auditory/oral method also facilitates development of reading and writing skills. The drawback of this method, however is that it requires lot of time and effort from teachers to teach an individual even the basic words. Sometimes the results are quite limited, with an individual being able to speak only a dozen or more words.

On the other side, sign language is a fully developed and autonomous language which individuals can learn with relative ease. It can be used to express a whole range of things which are impossible for individuals who can utilize only a limited amount of words. The drawback, however, is that deaf individuals sometimes totally depend on signing, and can barely communicate with people who do not know sign language.

Clarke School for the Deaf
In 1867, John Clarke, a wealthy merchant who lost his hearing in his later years, opened a school for the deaf in Northampton, Massachusetts. He invited Rogers to serve as its first director. The school was the first U.S. institution to teach the deaf by articulation and lip reading rather than by signing. It was also the first school that emphasized the need to start teaching children at an early age.

Rogers served as the director at the Clarke School from 1867 to 1886. She worked at the school with Alexander Graham Bell, who implemented his father's Visible Speech System to teach instructors in the oral method of teaching.

Later years
Poor health forced Rogers to leave the directorship of the Clarke School in 1886, and was succeeded by Caroline A. Yale. She returned to her home in North Billerica, Massachusetts, where she opened a kindergarten.

Harriet Burbank Rogers died on December 12, 1919, aged 85, in North Billerica, Massachusetts.

Legacy
The oral method of instruction was initially opposed by many in the United States, where sign language was preferred as the primary mode of communication for the deaf. However, Rogers' success in teaching deaf children to speak swayed public opinion on this matter in another direction, opening the door for the method of auditory/oral instruction in many American schools.

References
 Billarica Public Library Clarke School for the Deaf. Retrieved on October 27, 2007.
 Numbers, Mary E. 1974. My Words Fell on Deaf Ears: An Account of the First Hundred Years of the Clarke School for the Deaf. Alexander Graham Bell Association for the Deaf. 
 Rogers, Harriet Burbank. 1999. American National Biography, 18.

External links
 Auditory/Oral Method—Article on definition, benefits and drawbacks of this method. Retrieved December 12, 2007.
 Clarke School for the Deaf—On the history of the school. Retrieved December 12, 2007.
 Harriet Burbank Rogers—Biography in Biography.com. Retrieved December 12, 2007.
 Historical Perspective on the Education of Deaf Children in Western Cultures by Alan Marvelli, Smith College. Retrieved December 12, 2007.

1834 births
1919 deaths
American educators
Educators of the deaf
American women educators